Caborn may refer to

People
Richard Caborn (born 1943), a British politician 
Michael Caborn-Waterfield (1930–2016), a British business man

Places
Caborn, Indiana, an unincorporated community in Posey County, Indiana, United States

Other
Caborn-Welborn culture
Caborn principles, in the United Kingdom, criteria for the calling in of planning applications